Curtis Leroy Carlson (July 9, 1914 – February 19, 1999) was an American businessman and founder of Carlson and Radisson Hotel Group.

Early life and education
Carlson was born in Minneapolis, Minnesota, the son of Charles and Leatha Carlson. Charles Carlson was a Swedish-American immigrant who arrived as a child in Minnesota; Leatha Carlson was born in Downing, Wisconsin of a Danish father and Swedish mother. Curt began a career with Procter and Gamble after earning a BA in Economics in 1937 from the University of Minnesota where he served as President, and Recruitment Chair for Sigma Phi Epsilon fraternity- MN Alpha chapter.

Career

Carlson began working for Procter & Gamble and then founded the Gold Bond Stamp Company in 1938.  Carlson used "Gold Bond Stamps", a consumer loyalty program based on trading stamps, to provide consumer incentive for grocery stores. Carlson was the first entrepreneur to develop a loyalty program for the grocery chain through the issuance of trading stamps. What began as a simple loyalty program for grocers in the Midwest grew into one of the largest service providers of frequent shopper / buyer programs across a variety of retail and hospitality sectors.

Carlson expanded his offerings by purchasing the downtown Minneapolis Radisson Hotel in 1960 and building it into a national chain. He also acquired TGI Fridays, Carlson Leisure Group and hundreds of other hospitality businesses.

The Carlson School of Management at the University of Minnesota is named for him, in recognition of his $25 million gift, the largest single donation to a public university at that time. Curt Carlson created an estate in Lake Nebagamon, Wisconsin which was later converted to a business resort for corporations.

Awards
Royal Swedish Academy of Sciences Linnean Medal presented by H.M. Carl XVI Gustaf, King of Sweden
Viking Baron Award from the American Swedish Cultural Foundation
Golden Plate Award of the American Academy of Achievement, 1977
Horatio Alger Award; the Swedish-American of the Year Award, Stockholm, Sweden in 1981
Chairperson Emeriti of the Swedish Council of America from 1985 to 1989
Town and Country magazine Philanthropist of the Year Award, 1987–1988
International Citizen of the Year Award from the City of Minneapolis
 1989 Scandinavian-American Hall of Fame inductee
 1995 DeMolay International Hall of Fame

Selected works
Good as Gold : the Story of the Carlson Companies (Carlson Companies, Inc., Minneapolis, MN, 1994)

References

External links
The Carlson Family Foundation
University of Minnesota. Carlson School of Management
Minnesuing Acres

American people of Swedish descent
Businesspeople from Minneapolis
University of Minnesota College of Liberal Arts alumni
1914 births
1999 deaths
Burials at Lakewood Cemetery
American people of Danish descent
20th-century American businesspeople